The Museo d'arte is a museum for modern and contemporary art. It is in Avellino, Italy.

The museum was opened on 2 January 1995. It was developed from the private gallery of O. Stefano into a museum open to the public. The design for the museum building was ready in September 1993. It was finished in December 1994.

The museum has a library and a documentary film library. It plays video documentaries and speeches by famous art critics.

Collection 
Currently the museum exhibition presents to the public a few selected works of modern art and contemporary art. The original works include sculptures, drawings, oil paintings, and prints done by etching, lithograph and serigraph.

Artists 
Artists in the museum's permanent exhibition include:

Nineteenth century 
 Saverio Francesco Altamura [1822-1897]: Ritratto di scolaretta a Capri (1893);
 Giovanni Battista [1858-1925]: Pescatori sulla scogliera (1886) and Pescatori a Sorrento (1892);
 Pietro Bouvier [1839-1927]: La cacciagione (1897); 
 Gabriele Carelli [1820-1900]: Convento dei Cappuccini, Amalfi (1899);
 Giovanni Colmo [1867-1947]: Alberi intrecciati (1915); 
 Antonio Coppola [1850-1916]: Napoli paescatori (1876);
 Achille D'Orsi [1845-1829]: Scugnizzo: acquaiolo (1915);
 Walter Duncan [1848-1932]: Fanciulla nel bosco (1898) and Venditrice di fiori a St. Martin in the Fields (1919); 
 Gaetano Gigante [1770-1840]: Assunzione della Vergine (1815); 
 Vincenzo Irolli [1860-1949]: La guardianella (1930); 
 Salvatore Petruolo [1857-1946]: Paesaggio innevato (1874); 
 Oscar Ricciardi [1864-1935]: Costiera Amalfitana (1893); 
 Raffaele Tafuri [1857-1929]: Angolo di Pedavena (1910) and Tetti (1920); 
 Vincenzo Volpe [1855-1929]: Donna con chitarra (1895).

Twentieth century 
 Francesco Cangiullo [1884-1966]: In città (1953)
 Carlo Carrà [1881-1966]: Onde (1924) and Bagnate (1924); 
 Giorgio de Chirico [1888-1978]: I fuochi sacri (1929), Gli archeologi (1969) and I mobili nella valle (1971); 
 Pietro D’Achiardi [1879-1940]: Paesaggio di Lorenzana con calesse (1937); 
 Pierre Laprade [1875-1931]: Amour et Psyché (1925); 
 Atanasio Soldati [1896-1953]: Composizione (1949);
 Ugo Attardi [1926-2006]: Il viaggio di Ulisse (1990-2000); 
 Antonio Corpora [1909-2004]: Il cielo sugli alberi (1994);
 Salvatore Fiume [1915-1997]: Natività (1995);
 Emilio Greco [1913-1995]: Aretusa (1989); 
 Renato Guttuso [1911-1987]: Natura Morta (1981); 
 Michelangelo Pistoletto [1933]: Frattale bianco 4155372973840013258495611017395261542 (1999-2000);
 Ernesto Treccani [1920-2009]: Maternità (1980-1990); 
 Ezelino Briante [1901-1971]: Porto di Torre del Greco (1965); 
 Remo Brindisi [1918-1996]: Guerriero (1979); 
 Tonino Caputo [1933]: Il cortile (1987); 
 Lucio Cargnel [1903-1998]: Paesaggio di periferia (1963); 
 Mario Ceroli [1938]: Icosaedro (1980-1999); 
 Nino D'Amore [1949]: Piano di Sorrento (2014);
 Gianni Dova [1925-1991]: Uccello di Bretagna (1990); 
 Carmelo Fodaro [1936]: Natura morta (1970-1989); 
 Felicita Frai [1909-2010]: Fiori modesti (1989); 
 Giovan Francesco Gonzaga [1921-2007]: I due corsieri (1995) and Paesaggio Bergamasco (2000); 
 Beppe Guzzi [1902-1982]: Ville (1970); 
 Bruno Landi [1941]: Paesaggio (1987);
 Renzo Vespignani [1924-2002]: Marta (1982);

Twenty-first century 
 Giancarlo Angeloni [1966]: Positano chiesa madre (2013);
 Maurizio Delvecchio [1962]: Il tramonto e l'attesa (2013); 
 Athos Faccincani [1951]: Girasoli (2001);  
 Alfonso Fratteggiani Bianchi [1952]: Colore Blu 23050 (2014); 
 Rabarama [1969]: Palpit-azione (2010); 
 Paola Romano [1951]: Luna sospesa bianca (2011).

References

Sources and bibliography 
 (IT) A.A.V.V., "Mdao museo d'arte", in Tra arte e scienza. I musei privati di Avellino, ACO associazione culturale, Avellino 2012, pp. 6–7.
 (IT) A.A.V.V., "Museo d'arte Mdao", in Musei Avellino 2007, ACO associazione culturale, Avellino 2007, pag.4.
 (IT) CAMPITELLI F., MdAO Museo d'Arte, MdAO, Avellino 2014, pp. 4.

Art museums and galleries in Campania
Buildings and structures in Campania
Avellino